Gianluca Piccoli (born 30 May 1997) is an Italian footballer who plays as a midfielder for  club Città di Varese.

Club career

Torino 
Piccoli joined to Torino in July 2015 from Serie B club Varese.

Loan to Forlì 
On 15 July 2016, Piccoli was signed by Serie C club Forlì on a season-long loan deal for the 2016–17 season. On 27 August he made his professional debut in Serie C for Forlì as a substitute replacing Tommaso Tentoni in the 43rd minute of a 1–0 away defeat against Venezia. On 22 October, Piccoli played his first match as a starter and his first entire match for Forlì, a 0–0 away draw against Lumezzane. Piccoli ended his season-long loan to Forlì with 18 appearances, only 5 as a starter, however after losing the play-out matches against Alma Juventus Fano, Forli was relegated in Serie D, he was an unused substitute during the play-out.

Loan to Ravenna 
On 1 August 2017, Piccoli was loaned to Serie C side Ravenna on a season-long loan deal. Four weeks later, on 27 August, he made his debut for Ravenna in Serie C as a substitute replacing Christian Cenci in the 64th minute of a 1–0 home win over Fermana. On 17 September, Piccoli played his first match as a starter in Serie C, a 3–2 away defeat against Ternana, he was replaced by Carmine De Sena in the 53rd minute. On 10 February 2018 he played his first entire match for Ravenna, a 2–1 home defeat against Fano. Piccoli ended his season-long loan to Ravenna with 29 appearances, including only 10 as a starter.

Loan to Giana Erminio 
On 17 July 2018, Piccoli was signed by Serie C club Giana Erminio on a season-long loan deal. On 29 July he made his debut for the club as a substitute replacing Antonio Palma in the 62nd minute of a 1–0 away win over Alessandria in the first round of Coppa Italia. On 16 September he made his debut in Serie C for Giana Erminio as a substitute replacing Riccardo Chiarello in the 70th minute of a 0–0 away draw against Vicenza Virtus. On 17 October, Piccoli played his first match as a starter for Giana Erminio, a 1–1 home draw against Ravenna, he was replaced by Andrea Mandelli in the 74th minute. On 21 October he scored his first professional goal in 65th minute of a 3–0 away win over Virtus Verona. On 11 November he played his first entire match of the season, a 0–0 home draw against Südtirol. Piccoli ended his loan with 30 appearances and 1 goal.

Giana Erminio 
On 2 July 2019, after one year on loan, Piccoli joined to Serie C club Giana Erminio on a free-transfer and a 2-year contract. On 25 August he played his first match of the season for the club as a substitute replacing Lorenzo Remedi in the 68th minute of a 2–0 home defeat against Renate. Three weeks later, on 15 September, he played his first entire match for the club in this season, a 1–1 away draw against Gozzano. One week later, Piccoli scored his first goal of the season in the 57th minute of a 1–1 home draw against Carrarese. On 13 October he scored his second goal in the 20th minute of a 2–1 home win over Novara. However at the end of the first season at Giana Erminio, after having made 27 appearancesand scored 2 goals, he became a free agent.

Livorno 
On 6 November 2020, Piccoli joined to Serie C side Livorno on a free-transfer. Only two days later, on 8 November, he made his debut for the club as a substitute replacing Matteo Pallecchi in the 63rd minute, however he was sent-off with a red card in the 92nd minute of a 3–2 away defeat against Alessandria. On 14 November, Piccoli played his first match as a starter for Livorno, a 2–1 home defeat against Carrarese, he was replaced after 82 minute by Lorenzo Pecchia. One weeks later, on 21 November, he played his first entire match for the club, a 1–0 away defeat against Grosseto.

Grosseto
On 1 February 2021, he moved to Grosseto.

Career statistics

Club

Honours

Club 
Torino Primavera
 Supercoppa Primavera: 2015

References

External links
 

1997 births
Living people
Italian footballers
Association football midfielders
Serie C players
Torino F.C. players
Forlì F.C. players
Ravenna F.C. players
A.S. Giana Erminio players
U.S. Livorno 1915 players
U.S. Grosseto 1912 players
A.S.D. Città di Varese players